The Chamak-class missile boats (NATO code Osa II class) of the Indian Navy were an Indian variant of the Soviet Project 205 Moskit

The Osa-II Class missile boats formed the 25th Missile Vessel (K25) Squadron, also known as the Killers, based at Vizag. Osa is the Russian word for Wasp. All eight missile boats have been decommissioned from service.

Ships of the class

References

 
India–Soviet Union relations